Cleopatra is a c.1620 painting by Artemisia Gentileschi, now in the Fondazione Cavallini-Sgarbi collection in Ferrara. It was formerly misattributed to Guido Cagnacci. It shows Cleopatra committing suicide with an asp.

Gentileschi painted four different versions of Cleopatra, one of which is currently lost. This version shows the queen upright, in a pose used by contemporary artists such as Guido Reni.

References

Sources

1620 paintings
Paintings by Artemisia Gentileschi
Gentileschi
Paintings in Ferrara
Snakes in art